Pujaut is a commune in the Gard department in southern France. The village is situated on the south side of a small hill overlooking a flat plain that once formed the bed of a lake. The lake was drained at the beginning of the 17th century. The village is located 3.5 km west of the Rhône, 4.5 km north of Villeneuve-lès-Avignon and 5 km south of Roquemaure. In 2017 the commune had a population of 4,136.

Geography

Climate

Pujaut has a hot-summer Mediterranean climate (Köppen climate classification Csa).

Population

See also
Communes of the Gard department

References

Further reading

External links

Village council website (in French)

Communes of Gard